The Jezzine District is a district in the South Governorate of Lebanon. The capital is Jezzine.

76% of registered voters (59642) in the district are Christians. Of those, 60% are Maronite, 14% Greek Melkite Catholic, and the rest are minorities (Armenian Catholic, Eastern Orthodox, Evangelic, Protestants, etc...).  The remaining 24% are Druze, Shiite (mainly), and Sunni voters, respectively.
This distinguishes the district from the rest of Southern Lebanon, which is approximately 90% Muslim. Some notable towns include other than its capital Jezzine include Kfarhouna, Aichiyé, Bkassine, Kfar Falous, and Homsiyé.

Gallery

References

 
Districts of Lebanon